Thomas Adeoye Lambo,  (March 29, 1923 – March 13, 2004) was a Nigerian scholar, administrator and psychiatrist. He is credited as the first western trained psychiatrist in Nigeria and Africa. Between 1971 and 1988, he worked at the World Health Organization, becoming the agency's Deputy Director General.

Early life
Lambo was born in Abeokuta, Ogun State. He attended the famous Baptist Boys' High School, Abeokuta from 1935 to 1940. He then proceeded to the University of Birmingham, where he studied medicine. To further his studies and become specialized, in 1952, he enrolled at the Institute of Psychiatry, King's College London. Adeoye Lambo in due time became famous for his work in ethno-psychiatry and psychiatric epidemiology.

Career
In 1954, after studying and working as a surgeon in Britain, Dr Lambo returned to Nigeria where he was soon made the specialist in charge at the newly built Aro psychiatric hospital, Abeokuta. By then, Nigeria was undergoing a transition towards political independence which had hastened a culture of innovation and change instead of a period of feared stagnation or even regression. Prior to the independence movement, the Federal Government had tried to replicate the European system of creating asylums in the cities for lunatics and mentally ill individuals who were regarded as a social nuisance in the streets of many urban areas. The need to put the social anomalous individuals under control, sometimes care and confinement was initiated and a few asylums including one at Yaba were built. However, the institutionalization of mental health was viewed with suspicion by many Nigerians and many still depended on native medicines and herbalists for care. Adeoye Lambo sensing a ground for development, used the opportunity of an independent regional government to start his own out-patient treatment services, the Aro village, pioneering the use of modern curative techniques combined with traditional religion and native medicines. Adeoye, while at Aro, sought the help of farmers near the asylum to take some of the patients as laborers, while they simultaneously underwent medical treatment, and the patients also paid for any extra services required, such as housing. He traveled around the country and brought in a few traditional healers from different parts of Nigeria as practitioners. His style helped relieve public mistrust of mental health hospitals and introduced to public discourse the care and treatment of mentally ill citizens. He is credited as providing a platform for re-integrating mentally ill patients into a normal setting and environment and to a certain extent shedding at least some of the stigma associated with those suffering from mental illness.

Dr. Lambo was Vice Chancellor at the University of Ibadan from 1967 to 1971, during which a student, Adekunle Adepeju, was killed by the Nigerian Police Force at a protest. 

Dr. Lambo was the visiting Hannah Professor of History of Medical and Related Sciences at Queen's University in the late 1970s. The W.D. Jordan Rare Books and Special Collections Library at Queen's holds his personal library.

References

Vanguard, Renowned Psychiatrist, March 16, 2004
Jonathan Sadowsky, Imperial Bedlam: Institutions of Madness in Colonial Southwest Nigeria. University of California Press, 1999

External links
 Obituary in Psychiatric Bulletin (2004) 28: 469
 Obituary, This Day online
 In memoriam, TWAS Newsletter Vol.17 No.1, 2005 accessed at  April 11, 2007
W.D. Jordan Rare Books and Special Collections

Nigerian psychiatrists
1923 births
2004 deaths
Yoruba physicians
People from Abeokuta
Alumni of the University of Birmingham
Alumni of King's College London
20th-century Nigerian medical doctors
Vice-Chancellors of the University of Ibadan
TWAS fellows
Baptist Boys' High School alumni
Nigerian expatriates in the United Kingdom
Fellows of the African Academy of Sciences
Founder Fellows of the African Academy of Sciences